Rally Cycling may refer to:

Rally Cycling (men's team), a professional cycling team that competes on UCI Continental Tours
Rally Cycling (women's team), a professional cycling team that competes on the UCI Women's World Tour